Matterfall is a side-scrolling shooter video game developed by Housemarque and published by Sony Interactive Entertainment. It was released worldwide for PlayStation 4 in August 2017.

Gameplay
Matterfall is a side-scrolling shooter game with platforming elements. The game is set on a futuristic science fiction world that has been infected by an alien material known as "Smart Matter". The player takes control of Avalon Darrow who dons an armoured battle suit. Darrow can jump, dodge, and blast aliens. Darrow can also create platforms to explore the environment and generate shields to deflect attacks of enemies.

Development and release
Matterfall was developed by Housemarque and published by Sony Interactive Entertainment. The game was announced in October 2015 during Paris Games Week. It was released for PlayStation 4 on 15 August 2017 in North America and in Europe on the following day. Sony offered a copy of the game's soundtrack and a PlayStation 4 theme as a pre-order incentive for Matterfall.

Reception

Matterfall received "mixed or average" reviews from critics, according to review aggregator Metacritic. In Game Informers Reader's Choice Best of 2017 Awards, the game came in fourth place each for "Best Sony Game" and "Best Action Game". It was also nominated for "Arcade Game" at The Independent Game Developers' Association Awards 2017, and for "Control Design, 2D or Limited 3D" at the 17th Annual National Academy of Video Game Trade Reviewers Awards.

References

External links
 

Housemarque games
PlayStation 4 games
PlayStation 4-only games
Shooter video games
Side-scrolling video games
Single-player video games
Sony Interactive Entertainment games
Video games developed in Finland
Video games featuring female protagonists
Video games with 2.5D graphics
2017 video games